Mario Bortolazzi (born 10 January 1965, in Verona) is an Italian professional football coach and a former player, who played as a midfielder.

He played 12 seasons (241 games, 14 goals) in the Serie A for ACF Fiorentina, A.C. Milan, Hellas Verona F.C., Atalanta B.C. and Genoa C.F.C.

In his coaching career he has so far has always been an assistant to his former Milan teammate Roberto Donadoni.

Honours
Milan
 Serie A champion: 1987–88.

Genoa
 Anglo-Italian Cup winner: 1995–96.

External links
 

1965 births
Living people
Italian footballers
Serie A players
Serie B players
Serie C players
Mantova 1911 players
ACF Fiorentina players
A.C. Milan players
Parma Calcio 1913 players
Hellas Verona F.C. players
Atalanta B.C. players
Genoa C.F.C. players
Italian expatriate footballers
Expatriate footballers in England
Italian expatriate sportspeople in England
West Bromwich Albion F.C. players
U.S. Livorno 1915 players
Calcio Lecco 1912 players
Italian football managers
Association football midfielders